The Beauty of Loulan (楼兰美女) or Loulan Beauty (Other aliases: Loulan middle-aged woman(楼兰長女) is the preserved dead body of a woman who lived around 1800 BCE in the Xinjiang region of China.

Exceptionally well-preserved by the elements, the body was discovered in 1980 by Chinese archaeologists alongside several other mummies. The body is not of Chinese appearance, leading to the popular belief that the woman was of Uyghur origin. The government of China barred study of the mummies, but samples were smuggled out of the country and tested to find evidence of European ancestry in 1993. These findings were corroborated by further studies by Chinese researchers in 2007 and 2009. The mummy has since been displayed in museums.

Discovery 
The mummy was found on April 1, 1980, near the Silk Road in the Xinjiang, by Chinese archaeologists Mu Sun-ing (穆舜英) and members of the Archaeological Institute of the Xinjiang Academy of Social Sciences. She is one of the Tarim mummies, named after where they were found, the Tarim Basin.

For many years, the Chinese government forebade the testing of the mummy's DNA, due to fears that it would aid Uyghur nationalists. In 1993, Victor H. Mair and Italian geneticist Paolo Francalacci, were able to test some tissue samples, and although the Chinese government confiscated the samples, Mair claims a Chinese scientist later 'slipped in to their hands' as they were leaving. They concluded that the Loulan Beauty's ancestry came from Europe. Later, in 2007 and 2009, scientists from China's Jilin University and Fudan University both tested samples and corroborated the findings, suggesting that her ancestors may have traveled to Xinjiang through Siberia. Following the conclusion that the body is not Uighur, the Chinese government allowed the Loulan Beauty to be displayed in museums.

In 1980, she was restored by a Japanese painter who was named Yamaguchi Terunari(山本耀也). As of 2008, the mummy is displayed on the second floor of the Xinjiang Museum, "Mummy Hall"(古尸馆). The Chinese government has not allowed further access to the mummies by scientists outside China.

Description 
The mummy is wrapped in a wool cloth, cowhide leather, and linen. She is wearing leather shoes. There were several items made out of clay and some grain found nearby.

Unlike Egyptian mummies, which were preserved on purpose, the Loulan Beauty and other Tarim mummies were preserved unintentionally. The Loulan Beauty was buried near a salt lake in the  desert, where the arid and dry conditions preserved even the finer details of her face, such as her eyelashes.

The woman is estimated to have been in her 40s at the time of her death. The body is 152–155 cm in stature, and her blood type was O.

On examination by researchers, her shoes and clothing had been worn out and fixed repeatedly. Her hair was infested with lice. She had inhaled a great amount of sand, dust, and charcoal and she may have died of lung problems. She lived around 1800 BCE.

Significance 
Following her discovery, there was a popular belief in Xinjiang that the mummy, which was non-Chinese in appearance, was in fact Uyghur. A popular song was written about her. If this were true, it would be evidence of Uyghur presence in Xinjiang roughly 12,000 years prior to the current historical estimate, and would contest Chinese claims rooted in conquests by the Han dynasty ~200 BCE.

Collectively, the Tarim mummies are evidence of settlement in East Asia by people with European genetic markers far earlier than previously believed. In his 2007 paper on the mummies, Jin Li, a scientist at Fudan University also claimed to find evidence of South and East Asian genetic markers among the set, although Victor H. Mair disputes this finding. Elizabeth Wayland Barber examined the cloth fabrics preserved with the mummies and argued that they show ties to the Caucasus and even Scotland.

See also 

 Beauty of Xiaohe
 History of Xinjiang

References

External links 

 Xinjiang discovery provides intriguing DNA link xinhuanet, 2010-04-29.
 楼兰美女系列二：4000年前美女长啥样
 3800歲樓蘭美女將在新疆文物大展亮相 
 http://info.wenweipo.com/index.php?action-viewnews-itemid-47541-page-3 
 楼兰美女3800年面容之下的血缘之谜  北方新闻网2014-06-23
 相似率可达90%以上 专家复原出古楼兰美女原貌  人民网2004年5月31日
 木乃伊复原出"楼兰美女" 

European people
Xinjiang
18th century BC
2nd millennium BC in China
Tarim mummies